The spouse of the prime minister of Iceland refers to the wife or husband of Iceland's head of government.

Spouse of prime minister of Iceland (since 1970)

References

 
Prime Ministers of Iceland